Ryan Hreljac (born 30 May 1991) is a Canadian activist, who established the Ryan's Well Foundation to bring water to people in developing countries. He has received numerous awards for his work, and he was the youngest person ever to be bestowed with the Order of Ontario

Personal life
Hreljac is the son of Susan and Mark Hreljac of Kemptville, Ontario. He has three brothers: Keegan, Jordan and Jimmy.  Jimmy Akana was Hreljac's first pen pal from Uganda. Jimmy's parents disappeared during the country's civil war and he was raised by an aunt. He used to get up at midnight so that he could fetch water for his aunt before school. The two boys met during Hreljac's visit in 2000 to the Angolo Primary School in Uganda, where the first well that he funded was drilled. Jimmy was later abducted by a rebel group, Lord's Resistance Army, and then escaped to the home of an aid worker. The Hreljac family paid for his schooling for a couple of years and then brought him to Canada. Ryan's family adopted Jimmy, and he became a Canadian citizen in 2007.

The brothers both graduated from high school in June 2000. After his graduation from St. Michael's Catholic High School in Kemptville, Ontario, Hreljac graduated in 2013 from University of King's College in Halifax, Nova Scotia; his field of study was International Development and Political Science.  Hreljac was employed by Youth Ottawa, a nongovernmental organization after he graduated in 2013. About 20 people sit on the Ottawa Youth Engagement Committee to represent the interests of young people in the capital city's politics.

Charitable fundraiser and activist

While six years old, Hreljac learned in school that many people in Africa have a very hard time getting access to clean water. Hreljac began raising money for those affected by the global water crisis by doing household chores, which netted him $70 over a four-month period. Doing more chores and fund-raising, within twelve months he had raised $2,000, which was the cost to build a well, according to WaterCan, a non-profit organization that provides clean water to poor countries. In January 1999, he sent the money to WaterCan, who had the first well drilled in northern Uganda alongside the Angolo Public School. It was built by the Canadian Physicians for Aid and Relief that year.

In two years, he raised $61,000. The Canadian International Development Agency heard of Hreljac's efforts and matched $2 for every dollar that he raised. He told his story on  The Oprah Winfrey Show.

Hreljac founded Ryan's Well Foundation, a registered Canadian charity, in 2001 to build in Africa and educate children about sanitation and safe water. The foundation has three ways to educate school children about water issues, the Youth in Action program, the Getting Involved program and the School Challenge program.

The foundation's objective has expanded to build wells anywhere in the world. Millions of dollars for water and sanitation projects in Africa, Central America, and South Asia. The foundation has brought clean water to more than 892,725 people in 16 developing countries, through 1,166 water and sanitation projects. It has partners in twelve countries, including Burkina Faso, Ghana, Kenya, Uganda, Togo and Haiti to identify the communities most in need of a water or sanitation project. It has worked with Rotary Clubs on well projects. By 2015, it completed 900 projects benefiting 824,038 people. Some of the projects were for rain harvesting tanks in areas—like Guatemala, Haiti, and India—where that was the optimal solution for safe water. The 1,000th well was dug in the fall of 2015 in northern Uganda, in a district neighboring the first well. Supporters of the foundation include Matt Damon,  Oprah Winfrey, Jane Goodall, and Prince Charles.

Hreljac became Assistant Project Manager at the foundation in January 2015, in preparation for a June 2015 opening for Project Manager. His on-the-job training included trips to Kenya, Burkina Faso, and Uganda to train locals how to maintain their wells. He has also traveled extensively—including Brazil, Mexico, Qatar, and Argentina—to speak about the foundation.

Awards
Hreljac received the World of Children Awards in 2003, and a second time at the Montage Beverly Hills in April 2016 as an alumni winner. In 2004, he was named a Paul Harris Fellow. Hreljac was made a Lifesaver hero by The My Hero Project by late 2010. He is the youngest person ever to receive the Order of Ontario. He has also been awarded the Canadian Meritorious Service Medal, the Duke of Edinburgh Gold Award, The Wolf Award, and Planet Africa's Nelson Mandela Humanitarian Award.

Popular culture
Film
 Ryan's Well, directed by Lalita Krishna in 2001, tells the story of the first well.
 Blue Gold: World Water Wars, a documentary in 2008 in which Hreljac appears.
 Get Involved!, a television show in which Hreljac appears in 2008.
 Return to Ryan’s Well, a 2015 documentary, tells the story of Ryan Hreljac's return to his first well site at Angolo Primary School in Uganda and how the well changed the lives of the people in the area. The 27-minute film was also directed by Krishna. It was selected for the Planet in Focus Film Festival, one of the most significant environmental festivals that takes place in North America, that occurred in Toronto in October 2015.
Books
 The Water Princess is a book about a girl, Gie Gie, who walks with her mother each day to collect water. It is based upon the early life of Georgie Badiel, a model, who grew up in Burkina Faso. She established a foundation that partners with Ryan's Well Foundation to bring clean water to African communities.

References

Sources

External links
 h5h55rte hs7eRyan's Well Foundation
United Nations Millennium Declaration - HTML Version
United Nations Water for Life

1991 births
Living people
Food activists
Water-related charities
Canadian activists
Members of the Order of Ontario
Canadian child activists